Stallion Army Airfield  is a military airport in Socorro County, New Mexico. The airfield serves the White Sands Missile Range, in the northwest corner of which it is located.

References

Airports in New Mexico
United States Army posts